Troy College and Career High School, formerly Niles Community High School, is a non-traditional public high school in Troy, Michigan. A part of Troy Public Schools, it is attended by approximately 150 students in and around Troy. Students that attend TCCHS are generally 16–19 years old and behind on credits.

References

External links
 

Public high schools in Michigan
Schools in Troy, Michigan
High schools in Oakland County, Michigan
1995 establishments in Michigan